Jozef Baeten (born 8 April 1893 in Alphen) was a Dutch clergyman and bishop for the Roman Catholic Diocese of Breda. He was ordained in 1917. He was appointed in 1951. He resigned in 1961, and died in 1964.

References 

Dutch Roman Catholic bishops
1893 births
1964 deaths
People from Alphen-Chaam